was a  after Eichō and before Kōwa. This period spanned the years from November 1097 through August 1099.

Change of Era
 January 16, 1097 : The new era name was created to mark an event or series of events. The previous era ended and the new one commenced in Eichō 2, on the 21st day of the 11th month of 1097.

Events of the Jōtoku Era
 1097 (Jōtoku 1, 1st month): The dainagon Minamoto no Tsunenobu died at age 82.
 1097 (Jōtoku 1, 4th  month): The emperor visited the temple at Gion.
 1097 (Jōtoku 1, 10th  month): The emperor visited the home of Kampaku, Fujiwara no Moromichi.

Notes

References
 Brown, Delmer M. and Ichirō Ishida, eds. (1979).  Gukanshō: The Future and the Past. Berkeley: University of California Press. ;  OCLC 251325323
 Nussbaum, Louis-Frédéric and Käthe Roth. (2005).  Japan encyclopedia. Cambridge: Harvard University Press. ;  OCLC 58053128
 Titsingh, Isaac. (1834). Nihon Ōdai Ichiran; ou,  Annales des empereurs du Japon.  Paris: Royal Asiatic Society, Oriental Translation Fund of Great Britain and Ireland. OCLC 5850691
 Varley, H. Paul. (1980). A Chronicle of Gods and Sovereigns: Jinnō Shōtōki of Kitabatake Chikafusa. New York: Columbia University Press. ;  OCLC 6042764

External links 
 National Diet Library, "The Japanese Calendar" -- historical overview plus illustrative images from library's collection

Japanese eras